Conor Lehane (born 30 July 1992) is an Irish hurler who currently plays as a centre-forward for the Cork senior team.

Born in Midleton, County Cork, Lehane first played competitive hurling at Midleton CBS Secondary School. Here he won Rice Cup and Cork Colleges medals before later featuring on the Harty Cup team. As a student at University College Cork, Lehane won a Fitzgibbon Cup medal in 2013.

Lehane first appeared for the Midleton club at underage levels, winning a county minor championship medal in 2010 before claiming county under-21 championship medals in 2011 and 2013. As a member of the Midleton senior team he also won a county senior championship medal in 2013.

Having played for Cork at under-15 and under-17 levels, Lehane was just sixteen when he was selected for the Cork minor team. He played for two championship seasons with the minor team. Lehane subsequently enjoyed a three-year stint with the Cork under-21 team. By this stage he had also joined the Cork senior team, making his debut during the 2011 Waterford Crystal Cup. Since then Lehane has become a regular member of the starting fifteen. An All-Ireland runner-up in 2013, he won Munster medals in 2014 and 2017.

At international level Lehane won championship honours as a member of the composite rules shinty–hurling team in 2014.

Playing career

University College Cork

During his tenure at University College Cork, Lehane played a key role for the university's various hurling teams.

In 2012 he was at full-forward when UCC faced fierce local rivals Cork Institute of Technology in the final of the All-Ireland Freshers Championship. Lehane chipped in with 0-6 to secure a 1-24 to 3-13 extra time victory.

He progressed onto the UCC senior team during the 2012-13 college year, and lined out in the final of the Fitzgibbon Cup. Mary Immaculate College were the surprise opponents, however, tradition prevailed and UCC retained their title with a 2-17 to 2-12 victory.with Lehane giving a Man of the Match performance. It was Lehane's first Fitzgibbon Cup medal.

Midleton
Lehane plays his club hurling with Midleton and has enjoyed some success at underage levels.

In 2010 Lehane won a county minor championship with the club, following a 1-15 to 0-12 defeat of Na Piarsaigh.

Lehane had joined the club's under-21 team by 2011, and won a divisional under-21 championship. Midleton later secured the county under-21 championship, following a 1-11 to 0-8 defeat of Duhallow.

In 2013 Lehane completed his collection of county medals as he helped Midletion win a first senior county title since 1991 after victory over Sarsfield's with a Man of the Match display, scoring 2.10. He also won another county under-21 championship as captain, defeating Blackrock.

Cork

Minor and under-21
Lehane first came to prominence on the inter-county scene as a member of the Cork minor hurling team. He enjoyed little success in this grade before subsequently moving onto the county's under-21 side.

Senior

Lehane was just 18-years-old when he was added to the Cork senior hurling team. He made his first appearance at left wing-forward on 23 January 2011 and scored six points in the 3-17 to 1-22 defeat of University College Cork in the Waterford Crystal Cup. On 17 April, he made his first appearance in the National Hurling League when he came on as a 50th-minute substitute for Cian McCarthy in a 1-15 to 1-14 defeat of Dublin. A knee injury and the completion of the Leaving Certificate ruled him out of further action, however, he made his championship debut on 9 July in a 2-23 to 1-14 All-Ireland Qualifier defeat by Galway.

On 6 May 2012, Lehane lined out in the National League final. He was held scoreless at right wing-forward in the 3-21 to 0-16 defeat by Kilkenny.

Lehane lined out in his first Munster Championship final on 14 July 2013. He was substituted in the 41st minute and Cork eventually lost the game by 0-24 to 0-15. On 8 September, Lehane lined out at left corner-forward against Clare in the All-Ireland final. He scored 1-01 in the 3-16 to 0-25 draw. Lehane was again at left corner-forward for the replay on 28 September and scored two points in the 5-16 to 3-16 defeat. He ended the season by being nominated for an All-Star.

On 3 July 2014, Lehane won a Munster Championship medal after scoring five points in Cork's 2-24 to 0-24 defeat of Limerick in the last final to be played at the old Páirc Uí Chaoimh. He ended the season by being nominated for an All-Star.

On 3 May 2015, Lehane was at full-forward in Cork's 1-24 to 0-17 defeat by Waterford in the National League final.

Lehane won his second Munster Championship medal on 9 July 2017 in the 1-25 to 1-20 defeat of Clare in the final. He ended the season by being nominated for an All-Star.

On 1 July 2018, Lehane won a third Munster Championship medal following a 2-24 to 3-19 defeat of Clare in the final.

On 7 December 2020, it was reported in the Irish Examiner that Lehane would not be involved with the Cork senior hurling team for the 2021 season.

Personal life
Lehane grew up in Midleton and was educated at Midleton CBS Secondary School in the town. It was here that he first came to prominence as a hurler, representing the school in the Dr. Harty Cup. He is currently a student in University College Cork.

Career statistics

Club

Inter-county

Honours

Midleton CBS Secondary School
Rice Cup (1): 2006

University College Cork
Fitzgibbon Cup (1): 2013
All-Ireland Freshers Championship (1): 2012 (c)

Midleton
Cork Senior Hurling Championship (2): 2013, 2021
Cork Under-21 Hurling Championship (2): 2011, 2013 (c)
East Cork Under-21 A Hurling Championship (2): 2011, 2013 (c)
Cork Premier Minor Hurling Championship (1): 2010 (c)

Cork
Munster Senior Hurling Championship (3): 2014, 2017, 2018
Munster Senior Hurling League (1): 2017

Ireland
Shinty/Hurling International Series (1): 2014

References

External links
Conor Lehane profile at the Cork GAA website

1992 births
Living people
Ireland international hurlers
Midleton hurlers
UCC hurlers
Cork inter-county hurlers
People educated at Midleton CBS Secondary School